The Great Campaign of Sabotage is the fifth studio album from Overcome. Facedown Records released the album on February 1, 2011.

Reception

Writing a six out of ten review for Cross Rhythms, Peter John Willoughby says, "either you are going to enjoy the classic hardcore or rather you will be wanting to hear something fresh." Rob Shameless, awarding the album five stars at HM Magazine, states, "The Great Campaign of Sabotage is the perfect release to hold that title." Giving the album three stars from Indie Vision Music, Joshua Clark writes, "The Great Campaign Of Sabotage isn't exactly the ideal comeback album; they're some significant things that hold it down."

Tracks

References

2011 albums
Facedown Records albums
Overcome (band) albums